Artigas International Airport  is an airport serving Artigas, capital of the Artigas Province of Uruguay.

The airport was opened in November 1973.

Accidents and incidents
10 February 1978: a TAMU Douglas C-47A 75-DL registration CX-BJH/T511 flying from Artigas to Montevideo crashed shortly after take-off from Artigas on a domestic scheduled passenger flight. All 44 people on board, comprising 38 passengers and 6 crew, were killed, making this the second-worst crash involving a DC-3 (or derivative), and the worst aviation accident in Uruguay at the time. The airframe in question had first flown in 1943, and was damaged beyond repair in the accident.

See also

 Transport in Uruguay
 List of airports in Uruguay

References

External links
OpenStreetMap - Artigas
OurAirports - Artigas Airport

Airports in Uruguay
Airports established in 1973
Buildings and structures in Artigas Department